The Tour Opus 12, or Tour Credit Lyonnais, is a major office block in la Défense, Paris. It was designed by architects Jean Dubuisson and Jean-Pierre Jausserand, and Valode et Pistre for restoration.

References

Skyscrapers in Paris
La Défense